"Lost in America" is a single by musician Alice Cooper, who co-wrote the song with Bud Saylor and Icon guitarist Dan Wexler, taken from his 1994 album The Last Temptation. It was the most popular single from the album. “Lost in America” has been a live staple since its release, and is the solitary song from The Last Temptation that Cooper has performed live from 2000 onwards. The single featured a B-side, a live version of "Hey Stoopid".

Music video
A music video was made for the song, but it received almost no airplay at all. The music video features a young boy (supposedly Steven) reading the Marvel comics adaptation of the album, written by Neil Gaiman. The comic book comes to life as Alice Cooper and his band playing the song with several video clips referencing the song's lyrics.

Personnel
Alice Cooper - vocals
Stef Burns - guitar, background vocals
Greg Smith - bass, background vocals
Derek Sherinian - keyboards, background vocals
Ricky Parent - drums
Dan Wexler - additional guitar

Chart positions

References

1994 singles
Songs written by Alice Cooper
Alice Cooper songs
Epic Records singles
1994 songs